Siddham ( Ready) is a 2009 Telugu-language action film, produced by Kiran Kumar Koneru on Shreya Productions banner and directed by J. D. Chakravarthy. The film stars Jagapati Babu, Sindhu Menon, and music composed by Amar Mohile. This film's plot is inspired by the Hindi film, Ab Tak Chhappan.

Plot
The film begins at the Hyderabad Task Force department led by a dynamic deputy Dayanayak an encounter specialist. Though challenging, he has an enjoyable way of living with his ideal wife Gauri, and daughter Harini. Daya holds the best network over the underworld and is cordial with his juniors & informers. However, Daya's pre-eminence envies one of his boys Salim. Parallelly, a drastic feud rundown between mobsters Bilal, based abroad, and Chota. Meanwhile, a new kid Akhil on the block attains confidence in Daya, and nice amity develops between them. During these events, Daya establishes a love-hate telephonic conversation with Bilal. Sooner, Daya upends when his confidential adviser Commissioner Gurunarayana retries, and an amoral Sivalinga Prasad arrives. He aids Chota, also persecutes Daya and hoists Salim. Nevertheless, Daya strenuously never fails his path.

Once, Daya gets intel regarding the landing of professional sharpshooter Ashok the sidekick of Chota. So, he immediately takes action and apprehends him. But alas, his mother dies in that encounter where Ashok seeks vengeance and breaks out of the prison. At that point, Bilal notifies Daya that he has risk from Ashok. Then, on eve of Akhil's wedding, Gauri is slain by an unidentified. The cataclysmic forms severe impact on Daya. Yet, he is committed and initiates an inquiry which is hindered by Sivalinga Prasad. Thus, Daya resigns and wipes out Chota's gang. Forthwith, Sivalinga Prasad announces shoot-at-sight orders against Daya and assigns Salim who ensnares him. On the verge of his, encounter Akhil fires on Salim and frees Daya. Afterward, Daya knocks out Sivalinga Prasad too.

Now Daya calls for Bilal to fuse him which he accepts and succeeds in getting him out of India. Later that night, Daya & Bilal begin a dialogue when Bilal states Ashok as the homicide of Gauri. Here shockingly, Daya proclaims that Ashok has been encountered before Gauri's death. Notoriously, it is Bilal's foul play that killed Gauri on behalf of Ashok inducing Daya against Chota's gang. Anyhow, Daya has made this reverse artifice for it. He slaughters Bilal therein and returns. At last, with the backing of Gurunarayana Daya's crimes are posed as a covert mission and he is reinstated. Finally, the movie ends with Daya persistently proceeding to a new operation along with his team.

Cast

 Jagapathi Babu as Dayanand alias Daya
 Sindhu Menon as Gauri
 Kota Srinivasa Rao as Commissioner Gurunarayan
 Radha Ravi as Commissioner Sivalinga Prasad
 Mukul Dev as Bilal
 Kota Venkata Anjaneya Prasad as Saleem
 Dr.Bharath Reddy as Akhil
 Subbaraju as Ashok
 Narsing Yadav as Fancis
 Amith as Pappu
 Bharat as Vasim
 Govardhan as Narayana
 Dr. Siva Prasad as MLA Sudheer Babu
 Sandra as Padma
 Aparna as Pinky
 Baby Sivani as Harini

References

External links 
 One India movie review

2009 films
2000s Telugu-language films
2009 action films
Indian action films
Telugu remakes of Hindi films